Bangalore Saroja Devi (born 7 January 1938) is an Indian actress who has acted in Kannada, Tamil, Telugu and Hindi films. She acted in around 200 films in over six decades. She is known by the epithets "Abhinaya Saraswathi" (Saraswathi of acting) in Kannada and "Kannadathu Paingili" (Kannada's Parrot) in Tamil. She is one of the most successful actresses in the history of Indian cinema.

At the age of 17, Saroja Devi got her big break with her movie, the Kannada film Mahakavi Kalidasa (1955). In Telugu cinema, she made her debut with Panduranga Mahatyam (1957), and starred in a number of successful films until the late 1970s. The Tamil film Nadodi Mannan (1958) made her one of the top actresses in Tamil cinema. After her marriage in 1967, she continued to be the second in demand actress in Tamil films till 1974, but she continued to be one of the top actresses in Telugu and Kannada cinema from 1958 until the 1980s. She also starred in Hindi films until the mid-1960s, starting with Paigham (1959).

She played the lead heroine in 161 consecutive films in 29 years between 1955 and 1984. Saroja Devi received the Padma Sri, the fourth-highest civilian honour, in 1969 and Padma Bhushan, third highest civilian award, in 1992 from the Government of India, honorary doctorate from Bangalore University and Kalaimamani award from Tamil Nadu.

Early life 

Saroja Devi was born in Bangalore, Kingdom of Mysore (now Bengaluru, Karnataka) on 7 January 1938 in a Vokkaliga family. Her father Bhairappa was a police officer in Mysore, and her mother Rudramma was a homemaker. She was their fourth daughter. Bhairappa asked her to learn dancing, and encouraged her to take up acting as a career. A young Saroja Devi was accompanied often by her father to studios and he would patiently tie on her salangais and massage her swollen feet after her dancing stints. Her mother gave her a strict dress code: no swimsuits and no sleeveless blouses, which she followed for the rest of her career. She was first spotted by B.R. Krishnamurthy when she was singing at a function at the age of 13, but she declined the film offer.

Career

Rise to stardom 

Saroja Devi's debut movie and also her first major success was Honnappa Bhagavatar's Kannada film Mahakavi Kalidasa (1955), in which she played a supporting role. The film won the National Film Award for Best Feature Film in Kannada. Next, she acted in B. R. Panthulu's Tamil film Thangamalai Ragasiyam (1957), in which she performed a dance sequence.

Subsequently, she was noted by M. G. Ramachandran (MGR), who cast her as the female lead in Nadodi Mannan (1958), the movie that made her one of the most popular actresses in Tamil Nadu. She was then signed up for the Hindi film Paigham (1959), in which her co-stars included Dilip Kumar. She went on to work in other leading Hindi actors, including Rajendra Kumar in Sasural (1961), Sunil Dutt in Beti Bete (1964) and Shammi Kapoor in Pyaar Kiya To Darna Kya (1963). She also shot a few scenes with Raj Kapoor for Nazrana (1961), but was replaced by Vyjayanthimala after a conflict with the director C. V. Sridhar.

Following the success of Nadodi Mannan, she was also cast opposite the leading Tamil actors of that time: with Gemini Ganesan in Kalyana Parisu (1959), with Sivaji Ganesan in Bhaaga Pirivinai (1959) and again with MGR in Thirudadhe (1961). Her involvement in Tamil films also continued with superhits like Palum Pazhamum (1961), Vazhkai Vazhvatharke (1964), Aalayamani (1962), Periya Idathu Penn (1963), Puthiya Paravai (1964), Panakkara Kudumbam (1964), Enga Veetu Pillai (1965) and Anbe Vaa (1966). She came to be known as a "lucky mascot" for MGR films and acted with him in 26 films.

Her early successes in Kannada cinema included Chintamani (1957), School Master (1958) and Jagajyothi Basveshwara (1959). Her role as a patriotic anti-British queen in the Kannada Kittooru Rani Chennamma (1961) was widely acclaimed. In 1964, she and Kalyan Kumar acted in the first full-fledged Kannada colour movie Amarashilpi Jakanachaari.

Saroja Devi also achieved success in Telugu films, starring opposite N. T. Rama Rao in Seetarama Kalyanam (1961), Jagadeka Veeruni Katha (1961) and Daagudu Moothalu (1964). Amara Shilpi Jakkanna (1964, remake of Kannada film) and Rahasyam, her film Pelli Kaanuka (1960) with Akkineni Nageswara Rao, were also successful. The first Telugu film featured dubbing; wherein, Krishna Kumari dubbed her voice in Panduranga Mahatyam (1957). But in the subsequent years, Saroja Devi learnt Telugu language. Her Hindi films included  Sasural (1960), Opera House (1961), Pareeksha, Hong Kong (1962) and Pyar Kiya To Darna Kya (1963), which became successful. In 1962 she was crowned "Chaturbhaasha Taare", because of her popularity in these four languages.

The pair of MGR-Saroja Devi gave 26 back-to-back hit films together, which included 1: Nadodi Mannan (1958), 2: Thirudathe (1961), 3: Thaai Sollai Thattadhe (1961), 4: Paasam (1962), 5: Kudumba Thalaivan (1962), 6: Maadappura (1962), 7: Thayai Katha Thanayan (1963), 8: Dharmam Thalai Kaakkum (1963), 9: Needhikkuppin Paasam (1963), 10: Dheiva Thaai (1964), 11: Padagotti (1964), 12: Aasai Mugam (1965), 13: Nadodi (1966), 14: Thali Bhagyam (1966), 15: Naan Aanaiyittal (1966), 16: Petralthan Pillaiya (1966) and 17: Arasa Kattalai (1967). Her best performances opposite MGR were the "rich girl" roles: 18: Panathottam (1963), 19: Periya Idathu Penn (1963), 20: Panakkara Kudumbam (1964), 21: En Kadamai (1964), 22: Thaayin Madiyil (1964), 23: Enga Veettu Pillai (1965), 24: Kalangarai Vilakkam (1965), 25: Anbe Vaa (1966) and 26: Parakkum Paavai (1966). The women adored her dressing sense and her saris and blouses, ornaments, hairstyles were copied by girls and women.

In the 1960s, Saroja Devi became a fashion icon among the South Indian women, who mimicked her saris, blouses, jewellery, hairstyles and mannerisms. In particular, her saris and jewellery from the Tamil movies Enga Veettu Pillai (1965) and Anbe Vaa (1966) were popularized widely in magazines.

The pairing of Sivaji Ganesan and Saroja Devi gave 22 back-to-back hit movies: 1: Thangamalai Ragasiyam (1957), 2: Sabaash Meena (1958), 3: Engal Kudumbam Perisu (1958), 4: Bhaaga Pirivinai (1959), 5: School Master (Hindi) (1959), 6: Irumbu Thirai (1960), 7: Vidivelli (1960), 8: Palum Pazhamum (1961), 9: Paarthaal Pasi Theerum (1962), 10: Valar Pirai (1962), 11: Aalayamani (1962), 12: Kulamagal Radhai (1963), 13: Iruvar Ullam (1963), 14: Kalyaniyin Kanavan (1963) and 15: Puthiya Paravai (1964)

Post-marriage career 

After 1968, Saroja Devi's career in Tamil cinema gradually declined, and she became more active in Kannada movies. With her marriage in 1967 and the rise of younger heroines like K. R. Vijaya and Jayalalithaa producers stopped pairing her opposite MGR. Her last film with MGR was Arasa Kattalai (1967), which also starred Jayalalithaa. She continued starring in Tamil movies opposite Sivaji Ganesan after her marriage: 16: En Thambi (1968), 17: Anbalippu (1969), 18: Anjal Petti 520 (1969), 19: Arunodhayam (1971), 20: Thenum Paalum (1971), 21: Paarambariyam (1993) and 22: Once More (1997).

She worked with Gemini Ganesan in Pen Endral Pen (1967), Panama Pasama (1968), Thamarai Nenjam (1968), Ainthu Latcham (1969), Thanga Malar (1969), Kula Vilakku (1969), Malathi (1970) and Kann Malar (1970).

With Ravichandran she acted in the successful films Odum Nadhi (1969), Snegithi (1970), Malathi (1970), and Pathu Matha Bandham (1974).

With R. Muthuraman, she starred in Arunodhayam (1971), Uyir (1971) and Pathu Matha Bandham (1974), which was her last Tamil film as a lead actor until 1985.

She continued to be among the highest-paid actresses in Kannada and Telugu films. She was cast opposite the leading actor Dr. Rajkumar in several Kannada films, including Mallammana Pavada (1969), Nyayave Devaru (1971), Sri Srinivasa Kalyana (1974), Babruvahana (1977) and Bhagyavantharu (1977). Her other successful films from this period include Thande Makkalu (1971), Papa Punya (1971), Gunavanthudu (1975), Katha Sangama (1976), Sri Renukadevi Mahathme (1977), with Chiranjeevi, then with Vishnuvardhan in Shani Prabhava (1977) and Rudranaga (1984).

In Telugu cinema, she was cast opposite N. T. Rama Rao in films like Bhagyachakram (1968), Uma Chandi Gowri Sankarula Katha (1968), Vijayam Manade (1970), Mayani Mamatha (1970), Shakuntala and Daana Veera Soora Karna (1979).

In her long career she chiefly opted for romantic films only in the 1960s and later sentimental and socially relevant films right from the late 1960s to the 1980s. Sri Renukadevi Mahathme, a Kannada film released in 1977 was Saroja Devi's 150th film in her career and by 1984, she had completed 161 films as the main lead heroine, without ever playing supporting roles. Yarivanu, in Kannada, was the 161st film, in which she played the main lead heroine.

After husband's death 
Saroja Devi signed up for the film Ladies Hostel in 1985, but stopped shooting after her husband fell ill. He subsequently died in 1986, and she did not shoot or even meet non-family people for one year after his demise. She resumed shooting only in 1987. Ladies Tailor proved a successful film, but Saroja Devi refused to sign up for any more films. She completed the eight films that she had accepted before 1986, and these were released during 1987–1990. These included Thaimel Aanai (1988) and Dharma Devan (1989).

After completing her pending projects, Saroja Devi took a break of about five years from films. She returned to acting on the insistence by film producers and her fans, but, contrary to her previous record, she no longer accepted romantic roles. She starred opposite Sivaji Ganesan in Parambariyam (1993) in a lead role as a matron, and then performed a few roles as a supporting actress. In Kannada films, her notable supporting performances included her roles in Anuraga Sangama (1995) and Agni IPS (1997). She and Sivaji Ganesan acted in the Tamil film Once More (1997), which also includes scenes from their 1963 film Iruvar Ullam. Her latest film in Tamil was the film Aadhavan (2009), in which she played a judge's mother.

Twice in 1998 and 2005, Saroja Devi chaired film juries: the 45th National Film Awards and the 53rd National Film Awards jury. She served as the vice-president of Kannada Chalanchitra Sangha, and as a member of Tirumala Tirupati Devasthanams's local advisory committee. She runs a successful business. She also served as the Chairperson of the Karnataka Film Development Corporation, which had been set up as a private limited company by her and a few other film personalities in 1972.

Saroja Devi is now settled in Bangalore, where she is involved in social work. She has organized many donation camps in the name of her husband and her mother. She is also involved with charitable trusts, rehabilitation centers and health programs.

Her most recent work is Natasaarvabhowma, which released in 2019.

Personal life 
On 1 March 1967, Saroja married Sri Harsha, an engineer. Sri Harsha, an engineer, worked for Bharat Electronics, a Public Sector company. At that time, Saroja was facing a financial crisis and income tax troubles. Her husband helped her overcome these problems, and taught her how to manage her finances.

Sri Harsha supported Devi's acting career after marriage. When Saroja was asked in an interview as to how she did not discontinue acting due to her mother's insistence after 1967, she said: "Dilip Kumar once said he has asked Saira Banu to not to stop acting profession. The story was mentioned by Rajesh Khanna to my husband Sri Harsha, not to stop me from acting.". Sri Harsha died in 1986 due to various health problems.

Saroja Devi's children included her daughter Bhuvaneshwari and two grandchildren Indira and Gautam. Bhuvaneshwari was her niece, and had been adopted by her. Bhuvaneshwari died young, and Saroja Devi sponsors the Bhuvaneshwari Award for literature in her memory.

Awards and honors 

National awards

 2008 Lifetime Achievement Award by the Government of India, as a part of the celebrations of India's 60th independence day.
 1992 Padma Bhushan
 1969 Padma Shri

State awards

 2009 - Kalaimamani Lifetime achievement award by the Government of Tamil Nadu
 2009 - Dr. Rajkumar Lifetime Achievement Award by the Government of Karnataka
 2009 - NTR National Award from Government of Andhra Pradesh for the second time for the year 2009
 2001 - NTR National Award from Andhra Pradesh Government for the year 2001
 1993 - Tamil Nadu Government's MGR Award
 1988 - Karnataka Government's Rajyothsava award
 1980 - Abhinandana-Kanchana Mala award by Karnataka State
1969 - Tamil Nadu State Film Award for Best Actress for Kula Vilakku
 1965 - Abhinya Saraswathy honor by Karnataka

Other awards

 2009 - Natya Kaladhar Award— Tamil cinema, by Bharat Kalachar Chennai
 2007 - NTR award for remarkable achievement by Karnataka Telugu Academy
 2007-Rotary Sivaji Award by the Charitable Trust and Rotary Club of Chennai
 2006 Honorary Doctorate from Bangalore University
 2006 Vijay Award for Contribution to Tamil Cinema
 2003 Dinakaran award for All-round Achievement
 1997 Lifetime achievement awards by Cinema Express in Chennai
 1994 Filmfare Lifetime Achievement Award – South

B. Saroja Devi National Award
In 2010, Bharathiya Vidya Bhavan instituted Padma Bhushan B. Saroja Devi National Award, a lifetime achievement award to honour artists in the field of performing arts, annually. The recipients of the award including K. J. Yesudas, Vyjayantimala, Anjali Devi, Ambareesh, Jayanthi and others.

Filmography

References

External links 
 

Indian film actresses
Actresses in Kannada cinema
Recipients of the Padma Bhushan in arts
Recipients of the Padma Shri in arts
Actresses from Bangalore
1938 births
Living people
Actresses in Hindi cinema
Kannada people
Actresses in Telugu cinema
Actresses in Tamil cinema
Recipients of the Kalaimamani Award
20th-century Indian actresses
21st-century Indian actresses